Musik is the third studio album by Canadian electronic music producer Richie Hawtin, and his second studio album under the alias Plastikman. It was released on November 8, 1994 by Novamute Records and Plus 8 and peaked at number 58 on the UK Albums Chart.

Critical reception

In a contemporary review of Musik, Ben Turner of The Guardian stated that Hawtin is "somehow managing to salvage sounds which others feel but fail to express. Musik is music as you've never heard it before." Turner concluded that "when people look back and hail Kraftwerk, Larry Heard, DJ Pierre and Derrick May as the most influential artists in this genre, they will soon include Plastikman in this roll-call."

Jason Birchmeier of AllMusic later wrote that Musik "masterfully covers all aspects of the minimal techno spectrum, from acidic anthems to ultra-minimal explorations and back, in the process showcasing Hawtin's staggering command of the Roland 303 and 909 drum machines as well as his brilliant grasp of album-level continuity".

Track listing

Personnel
Credits adapted from liner notes.
 Richie Hawtin – music

Charts

References

External links
 

1994 albums
Richie Hawtin albums
Novamute Records albums